The 2010 Sunshine Tour was the 11th season of professional golf tournaments since the southern Africa based Sunshine Tour was relaunched in 2000, and the 4th since the tour switched a calendar based season in 2007. The Sunshine Tour represents the highest level of competition for male professional golfers in the region.

The tour is based predominantly in South Africa with other events being held in neighbouring countries, including Swaziland, Zambia and Namibia.

As usual, the tour consisted of two distinct parts, commonly referred to as the "Summer Swing" and the "Winter Swing". Tournaments held during the Summer Swing generally have much higher prize funds, attract stronger fields, and are the only tournaments on the tour to carry world ranking points, with some events being co-sanctioned with the European Tour. Since the tour switched to a calendar based season, this part of the tour has been split in two, with some events being held at the start of the year, and the remainder in December. The Winter Swing ran from April to early December.

The Order of Merit was won by Charl Schwartzel.

Schedule
The following table lists official events during the 2010 season.

Order of Merit
The Order of Merit was based on prize money won during the season, calculated in South African rand.

Ernie Els was ineligible for the Order of Merit having only played in two tournaments during the season. The R1,467,200 he earned from those events would have been enough for 5th place.

Notes

References

External links

Sunshine Tour
Sunshine Tour